Song Sugwon, also Song Soo-Kwon (March 15, 1940 – April 4, 2016), was a modern South Korean writer.

Life
Song Sugwon was born on March 15, 1940, in Goheung County, South Jeolla Province. Song attended Suncheon Normal School and Goheung Junior High School before from Sorabol Arts College with a degree in Creative Writing. Song worked at the Kwangju Yogwang Girls Middle School as both a teacher and an educational researcher.

Career
Of Song Sugwon's poetry, the Korea Literature Translation Institute wrote:
Bitterness is the most salient sentiment in this Song Sugweon’s work; but his poetry emphasizes not the typical sentiment of a weak bitterness giving rise to self-contempt, but rather, within that bitterness, a dignified masculine identity of immanent intimacy and power. He has published many works that succeed in preserving the flavor and style of the southern dialects, designed to inspire the people through a consciousness of history and regional differences.
Song's work centers on the lives of common people, although Song does not see live as a confrontation between have and have-nots, and Song's work follows the lines of classical Korean lyricism. Having lived in South Jeolla Province most of his life, including at the time of his death, Song Sugwon was able to infuse his poetry with the regional culture.

Works in Korean (partial)

Poetry
 At the Temple Gate (1980)
 Dreaming Island (1982)
 Mute Porcelain (1984)
 Bird! Bird! O Bluebird! (1986)
 Our Land (1988)
 Even in Sleep I Smile at the Thought of You (1991)
 Watchman on a Starry Night (1992)
 Wildflower World (1999)
 Green Prison (1999)
 Pacheonmu (2001)
 Planting a Joseon Plum Tree in the Frozen Ground (2005)
 A Country Road or a Liquor-Barrel (2007)
 Magpie food, Unknown)

Prose
 Once Again At the Temple Gate (1985)
 Love Folds Its Huge Wings (1989)
 Journey to the South (1990)
 Indigo World (1998)
 Mandala Sea (2002)

Awards
 Literature and Thought New Writers Award (1975)
 Ministry of Culture and Information Arts Award
 Geumho Cultural Foundation Arts award
 Jeollanam-do Culture award
 Sowol Poetry Prize (1987)

References

Korean writers
South Korean poets
1940 births
2016 deaths